Lady Ichikawa (市川局 Ichikawa no Tsubone, d. April 5, 1585) was a Japanese female warrior (Onna-musha) from the Sengoku period who helped drive out Ouchi and the Otomo clan from Chugoku. She was the wife of Ichikawa Tsuneyoshi, a samurai warlord and retainer of Mōri Motonari. She defended Konomine castle from the attack by Ōuchi.

Siege of Konomine castle 

Ōuchi Teruhiro sided with Ōtomo Sōrin, a daimyo Christian in Bungo Province, after Mori Motonari's troops assassinated Sue Harukata at the Battle of Itsukushima. In 1569, Ōuchi Teruhiro led an attack on the Konomine castle. At this time Ichikawa Tsuneyoshi was fighting against the Otomo clan, in order to capture Tachibana Castle in Kyushu. When Ōuchi Teruhiro invaded the Ichikawa clan area, Lady Ichikawa remained as leader and prepared to defend the Konomine castle. Lady Ichikawa's ladies-in-waiting pressed her to fight on the front line, the ladies left the castle wielding swords. She appeared on the castle walls and led the defense along with her ladies against Ouchi's army. Lady Ichikawa commanded the few castle soldiers and repulsed the large army. In the fierce 10-day battle the castle's defense remained strong and Teruhiro fled. Teruhiro was defeated in front of the Mori army that had left of Kyushu and killed himself. Due to this achievement, Lady Ichikawa received a letter of appreciation from Mōri Terumoto on July 6 in 1577.

See also 
 Onna-musha

References

Japanese women in warfare
People of Sengoku-period Japan
Women of medieval Japan
16th-century Japanese women
Women in 16th-century warfare
Mōri retainers